Michael Tyburski (born August 8, 1984) is an American film director and screenwriter, best known for directing The Sound of Silence, which premiered at the 2019 Sundance Film Festival. The film was acquired for international distribution by Sony Pictures Worldwide. and by IFC Films in the United States. His short film Palimpsest premiered at Sundance in 2013, where it won a Special Jury Award, and his short Actor Seeks Role was featured on The New Yorkers Screening Room series. In 2013, he was named amongst the "25 New Faces of Independent Film" by Filmmaker Magazine.

Tyburski was born and raised in Vermont's Northeast Kingdom and attended film school at the College of Santa Fe in New Mexico.

References 

1984 births
Living people
American film directors
American screenwriters